Edulica is a monotypic  snout moth genus first described by George Hampson in 1901. Its single species, Edulica compedella, described by Philipp Christoph Zeller in 1881, is found in Colombia.

References

Phycitinae
Monotypic moth genera
Moths of South America
Taxa named by George Hampson